Wangdi Norbu is a Bhutanese politician who served as Finance Minister in the Council of Ministers from July 2003 to July 2007, and from April 2008 to May 2013. He was the chairman of Royal Monetary Authority of Bhutan from 2003 to 2007 and from 2008 to 2010.

He graduated from the University of Western Australia with a bachelor's degree in economics in 1976. He has been the Bhutan Peace and Prosperity Party (DPT) member of the National Assembly of Bhutan for the constituency of Bartsham Shongphu since the country's first National Assembly election in 2008. He retained the same seat at the 2013 National Assembly election.

References

Year of birth missing (living people)
Living people
University of Western Australia alumni
Bhutanese MNAs 2013–2018
21st-century Bhutanese politicians
Druk Phuensum Tshogpa politicians
Finance ministers of Bhutan
Government ministers of Bhutan
Bhutanese politicians
Place of birth missing (living people)
Bhutanese MNAs 2008–2013
Druk Phuensum Tshogpa MNAs